Hilaire Hellebaut (19 October 1895 – 18 May 1951) was a Belgian racing cyclist. He rode in the 1922 Tour de France.

References

1895 births
1951 deaths
Belgian male cyclists
Place of birth missing